Eryngium ovinum, commonly known as the blue devil, is a plant species native to Australia.

References

ovinum
Flora of New South Wales
Flora of South Australia
Plants described in 1825